This is a list of Internet organizations, or organizations that play or played a key role in the evolution of the Internet by developing recommendations, standards, and technology; deploying infrastructure and services; and addressing other major issues.

Standards development and broad-based advocacy and educational organizations

IAB   (Internet Architecture Board)
ICANN (Internet Corporation for Assigned Names and Numbers) 
IANA  (Internet Assigned Numbers Authority)
IESG  (Internet Engineering Steering Group)
IETF  (Internet Engineering Task Force)
IRTF  (Internet Research Task Force)
ISOC  (Internet Society)
NANOG (North American Network Operators' Group)
NRO   (Number Resource Organization)
W3C   (World Wide Web Consortium)
OTF (Open Technology Fund)
EFF (Electronic Frontier Foundation)

Regional Internet Registries (RIRs)
AfriNIC (African Network Information Centre)
ARIN    (American Registry for Internet Numbers)
APNIC   (Asia-Pacific Network Information Centre)
LACNIC  (Latin America and Caribbean Network Information Centre)
RIPE    (Réseaux IP Européens Network Coordination Centre)

United Nations bodies
Internet Governance Forum
World Summit on the Information Society
Working Group on Internet Governance

Research and education organizations

Merit (Merit Network, Inc.)
NLR (National LambdaRail)
Internet2 (aka University Corporation for Advanced Internet Development)

Accessibility and affordability initiatives

 Internet.org
 Alliance for Affordable Internet

Commercial organizations

Commercial organizations that made early and significant contributions to the development of the Internet or services available on the Internet:

Amazon.com
AOL (America Online)
eBay
Facebook
Flickr
Google
LinkedIn
Network Solutions (NSI)
Twitter
Yahoo!
YouTube
Instagram
SourceForge

Historical organizations

Organizations that played an important role in the development of the Internet in the past:

Advanced Network and Services (ANS)
DARPA (U.S. Defense Advanced Research Projects Agency)
InterNIC
NSF (U.S. National Science Foundation)
PSINet
UUNet

 
Internet
Internet org
Internet org